Mabon ap Modron is a prominent figure from Welsh literature and mythology, the son of Modron and a member of Arthur's war band. Both he and his mother were likely deities in origin, descending from a divine mother–son pair. He is often equated with the Demetian hero Pryderi fab Pwyll, and may be associated with the minor Arthurian character Mabon ab Mellt.

Etymology
His name is related to the Romano-British god Maponos, whose name means "Great Son"; Modron, in turn, is likely related to the Gaulish goddess Dea Matrona. The name Mabon is derived from the Common Brittonic and Gaulish deity name Maponos "Great Son", from the Proto-Celtic root *makwo- "son". Similarly, Modron is derived from the name of the Brittonic and Gaulish deity Mātronā, meaning "Great Mother", from Proto-Celtic *mātīr "mother".

Role in Welsh tradition

Culhwch ac Olwen

Culhwch's father, King Cilydd, the son of Celyddon, loses his wife Goleuddydd after a difficult childbirth. When he remarries, the young Culhwch rejects his stepmother's attempt to pair him with his new stepsister. Offended, the new queen puts a curse on him so that he can marry no one besides the beautiful Olwen, daughter of the giant Ysbaddaden. Though he has never seen her, Culhwch becomes infatuated with her, but his father warns him that he will never find her without the aid of his famous cousin Arthur. The young man immediately sets off to seek his kinsman. He finds him at his court in Celliwig in Cornwall and asks for support and assistance. Cai is the first knight to volunteer to assist Culhwch in his quest, promising to stand by his side until Olwen is found. A further five knights join them in their mission.

They travel onwards until they come across the "fairest of the castles of the world", and meet Ysbaddaden's shepherd brother, Custennin. They learn that the castle belongs to Ysbaddaden, that he stripped Custennin of his lands and murdered the shepherd's twenty-three children out of cruelty. Custennin sets up a meeting between Culhwch and Olwen, and the maiden agrees to lead Culhwch and his companions to Ysbadadden's castle. Cai pledges to protect the twenty-fourth son, Goreu, with his life.

The knights attack the castle by stealth, killing the nine porters and the nine watchdogs, and enter the giant's hall. Upon their arrival, Ysbaddaden attempts to kill Culhwch with a poison dart, but is outwitted and wounded, first by Bedwyr, then by the enchanter Menw, and finally by Culhwch himself. Eventually, Ysbaddaden relents, and agrees to give Culhwch his daughter on the condition that he completes a number of impossible tasks (anoethau), including hunting the Twrch Trwyth and recovering the exalted prisoner, Mabon son of Modron, the only man able to hunt the dog Drudwyn, in turn the only dog who can track the Twrch Trwyth.

Arthur and his men learn that Mabon was stolen from his mother's arms when he was three nights old, and question the world's oldest and wisest animals about his whereabouts, until they are led to the salmon of Llyn Llyw, the oldest animal of them all. The enormous salmon carries Arthur's men Cei and Bedwyr downstream to Mabon's prison in Gloucester; they hear him through the walls, singing a lamentation for his fate. The rest of Arthur's men launch an assault on the front of the prison, while Cei and Bedwyr sneak in the back and rescue Mabon. He subsequently plays a key role in the hunt for the Twrch Trwyth.

Other appearances
One of the earliest direct reference to Mabon can be found in the tenth century poem Pa Gur, in which Arthur recounts the feats and achievements of his knights so as to gain entrance to a fortress guarded by Glewlwyd Gafaelfawr, the eponymous porter. The poem relates that Mabon fab Mydron (a misspelling of Modron) is one of Arthur's followers, and is described as a "servant to Uther Pendragon". A second figure, Mabon fab Mellt, is described as having "stained the grass with blood". He further appears in the medieval tale The Dream of Rhonabwy, in which he fights alongside Arthur at the Battle of Badon and is described as one of the king's chief advisors.

Mabon is almost certainly related to the continental Arthurian figures Mabonagrain, Mabuz, Nabon le Noir and Maboun.

References

Arthurian characters
Welsh gods
Welsh mythology
Uther Pendragon